The Presses universitaires de Louvain (PUL) is a university press of the University of Louvain (UCLouvain) located in Louvain-la-Neuve, Belgium. It was established in 2000 to mark the 575th anniversary of the Old University of Louvain. The Presses universitaires de Louvain publish mainly in French and English, but also occasionally in Spanish, Dutch, Italian, German and other languages. It publishes approximately 50 books annually in every discipline.

References

External links
 Official website 

University presses of Belgium